Thomas Sweeney may refer to:

Thomas Sweeney (glassmaker) (1806–1890), Irish-born glass manufacturer and politician in Wheeling before creation of West Virginia
Thomas Sweeney (Connecticut politician) (1933–2007), member of the Connecticut House of Representatives
Thomas Sweeney (West Virginia politician) (1903–1973), member of the West Virginia Senate
Tom Sweeney, member of Kerfuffle
Thomas Sweeney (rugby union) (c. 1929–2017), rugby union player who represented Australia
Thomas 'Sinbad' Sweeney, a character in Brookside

See also
Thomas William Sweeny (1820–1892), Irish soldier who served in the American army